The Australian Marketing Institute (AMI) is Australia's largest professional body for marketers. The AMI's core purpose is to support progress in the careers of their members and advance the marketing profession. The AMI has over 30,000 marketers in its network and is certification body for the Certified Practising Marketer designation in Australia.

History
Founded in 1933 as the Institute of Sales and Business Management, in 1965 the name was changed to Institute of Sales and Marketing Executives, and in 1975 to its current name, Australian Marketing Institute.

Structure 
AMI operates under the direction of a National Board of Directors and the help of volunteer councilors known as the State Committees.

Current National Board of Directors 
 Chair: Lynda Cavalera
Deputy Chair: Andrew Thornton
 Company Secretary: Narendra Prasad
 Director: Nick Kariotoglou
 Director: Nicholas Ridis
 Director: Mona Lolas

Previous National Board of Directors

TBA

Membership 
In addition to corporate membership, there are several personal membership categories:
 Associate Member: Members of the AMI are entitled to use the post nominal AMAMI, and have voting rights in the institute's elections as well as eligibility for appointment to the National Board and state council.
 Fellow: A Fellow is someone who has held membership with the AMI for at least 5 years. Fellows are entitled to use the post nominal FAMI CPM.
 International Member
 Student.
 Graduate. Graduating student members or new applicants get discounted membership for the first two years upon completion of their studies.

Certified Practising Marketer (CPM) 
The AMI offers a designation for professional marketers - Certified Practising Marketer or CPM - recognition of formal education and successful application of marketing knowledge and skills.

To maintain their certification, CPMs are required to undertake a minimum of 100 hours of structured learning such as workshops, tertiary studies, forums and training.

Awards 
The annual Awards for Marketing Excellence were founded in 1982. The Awards recognises notable achievements across 18 categories and presented 7 special awards:

 Use of Artificial Intelligence in Marketing
 Brand Revitalisation
 Customer Acquisition Marketing
 Market and Consumer Insights
 Customer Retention
 Content Marketing
 Creativity in Brand, Product or Service Marketing
 Customer Experience Management Strategy
 Data Driven Marketing Strategy
 Product/Service Revitalisation
 Integrated Marketing Communications Program
 Not for Profit Marketing
 Public Sector Marketing
 Small Budget Marketing
 Social Change Marketing
 Social Media Marketing
 Sponsorship Effectiveness
 Omnichannel strategy

Special Awards
 Sir Charles McGrath Award
 Certified Practising Marketer of the Year
 Chief Marketing Officer of the Year
 Future Leader of the Year Award
 Campaign of the Year
 Marketing Team of the Year
 Best Marketing Agency

Past winners 
Notable recipients include:
Gail Kelly (2007)

References

External links 
http://www.ami.org.au AMI Homepage

Organizations established in 1933
Professional associations based in Australia
Marketing organizations
Marketing in Australia